St. Xavier's College, Thumba, was founded by the Jesuits in 1964, and is affiliated with the University of Kerala. It awards nine undergraduate degrees and two postgraduate degree.

History
Founded in 1964, in 1965 the College was shifted to its present site in Thumba, a suburb of Thiruvananthapuram which is the capital of Kerala. The College was upgraded in 1977 when co-education began. In 2005 it became a Post Graduate College with the addition of an M.Sc. in physics.

Academics
 Bachelor of Science (B.Sc.) in physics, chemistry, mathematics, and Botany & Biotechnology
 Bachelor of Arts (B.A.) in economics, history, Malayalam with mass communication and English with Media Studies
 Bachelor of Commerce (B.Com.)
 Master of Commerce
 Master of Science (M.Sc.) in physics.

Notable alumni
 Prem Kumar, Actor
 Alexander Jacob (police officer)
 Jacob Punnoose  Director General of Police of Kerala
 S R Nair, Entrepreneur

See also
 List of Jesuit sites

References  

Jesuit universities and colleges in India
Colleges affiliated to the University of Kerala
Colleges in Thiruvananthapuram
Educational institutions established in 1964
1964 establishments in Kerala